Falls–Hobbs House is a historic home located near Statesville, Iredell County, North Carolina.  The house is dated to the 1820s or 1830s, and is a -story, three bay by two bay, frame dwelling.  It has a steeply pitched gable roof, external end chimneys, and rests on a fieldstone foundation.  The interior has Georgian, Federal, and Greek Revival style design elements.  Also on the property is a contributing well house with a pyramidal roof.

It was added to the National Register of Historic Places in 1982.

References

Houses on the National Register of Historic Places in North Carolina
Georgian architecture in North Carolina
Federal architecture in North Carolina
Greek Revival houses in North Carolina
Houses in Iredell County, North Carolina
National Register of Historic Places in Iredell County, North Carolina